Pimelea aeruginosa is a species of small shrub in the family Thymelaeaceae. It is a small shrub with yellow flowers and is endemic to Western Australia.

Description
The pendulous inflorescence consist of numerous compact yellow flowers. The stamens may be longer or shorter than the sepals. Flowering occurs mostly from  May to October.

Taxonomy and naming
Pimelea aeruginosa was first formally described in 1869 by Ferdinand von Mueller and the description was published in Fragmenta Phytographiae Australiae. The specific epithet (aeruginosa) is derived from the Latin word  aeruginosus meaning "verdigris" with reference to the flower bracts when dry.

Distribution and habitat 
This species mostly occurs inland from Geraldton, to Esperance on sand, gravel, sandy clay, over laterite in mallee dominated locations.

References

aeruginosa
Malvales of Australia
Taxa named by Ferdinand von Mueller
Plants described in 1869